Amicale F.C.
 Erakor Golden Star
 Ifira Black Bird F.C.
 Pango Green Bird F.C.
 Spirit 08 FC
 Tafea F.C.
 Tupuji Imere F.C.
 Westtan Verts F.C.
 Yatel F.C.

Vanuatu
 
Football clubs
Football clubs